Norwood, London may refer to:
Norwood Green,  in the London Borough of Ealing in London, England
Norwood Junction railway station, National Rail station in South Norwood of the London Borough of Croydon, south London
Norwood New Town, within the larger district of Upper Norwood in Southeast London
South Norwood, a district of south London within the London Borough of Croydon
South Norwood Country Park
South Norwood Lake and Grounds
South Norwood Leisure Centre
South Norwood Library
South Norwood Primary School
South Norwood Recreation Ground
Norwood Junction railway station
Upper Norwood, an area of south-east London within the London Boroughs of Bromley, Croydon, Lambeth and Southwark
West Norwood (formerly Lower Norwood), in south London within the London Borough of Lambeth
Norwood Park (London), in West Norwood
West Norwood railway station
West Norwood Cemetery
Parts of the A215 road in South London
Norwood Road
Norwood High Street
South Norwood Hill

See also
Great North Wood
Norwood (charity)
Norwood (disambiguation)